Club Leones Negros de la Universidad  de Guadalajara, also known as Leones Negros,  Leones Negros UdeG, Universidad de Guadalajara,  or UdeG, is a football club that currently plays in the Liga de Expansión MX.

History
The Universidad de Guadalajara football club, nicknamed Leones Negros (Black Lions), was founded on August 19, 1970, and started in the Tercera División (third division) in the Mexican professional league, where they played for two seasons after which they gained promotion to Segunda División Profesional.

They reached the top division by acquiring the Primera Division's franchise of Torreón.

During their first years in the top flight they had several skilled Brazilian players, reason for which noted sports broadcaster Ángel Fernandez started to call them "Leones Negros" (the Black Lions), a nickname that stuck and remains part of the folklore of Mexican football.

In the seasons 1975–76, 1976–77 and 1989–90 the team achieved the runners-up in the Primera División. In addition, in 1978 the club won the CONCACAF Champions' Cup together with the clubs Comunicaciones F.C. from Guatemala and Defence Force F.C. from Trinidad and Tobago.

Disappearance of los Leones Negros de la UdeG
After 20 years in top flight football the team was in decline, alleged questionable financial dealings, a very poor squad and hardly any local fans (who are loyal to more popular teams like Guadalajara, better known as "Chivas" and to a lesser extent, Atlas) Leones Negros were acquired by the Federación Mexicana de Fútbol Asociación, to make way for the reduction in the number of teams in the Primera División. Their last game was on May 27, 1994 against Atlas, in which they lost 2–1.

New Era
After the disappearance of the team by the Federación Mexicana de Futbol, the franchise maintained the third division reserve squad, that become the main team, the club obtained a title in the verano 1997 tournament, gaining promotion to the Primera División "A" where they stayed until the franchise was sold and moved to Orizaba in 2002. During this time the franchise was named Atlético Bachilleres, name it had since the 1970s when the reserve team was established.

Between 2002 and 2009 the team played as Cachorros UdeG in Segunda División Mexicana in the Norte region and a few seasons back was close to gaining promotion to the Primera División A, first losing the final against, Académicos and then losing to Chivas La Piedad. For the Apertura 2007 season they changed stadium to Estadio Municipal Santa Rosa de Ciudad Guzmán, Jalisco, but have stated that some of their home games will still played at their traditional home in twice worldcup host Estadio Jalisco. In 2009 Cachorros UdeG became the reserve team of the club, a situation that remained until 2014, when it became Leones Negros UdeG Premier.

Return to the Primera División A
For some time businessmen, among them Jorge Vergara, tried to return the team of Club Universidad de Guadalajara to the top divisions of football in Mexico, this was achieved through the purchase of the franchise of Primera División A's CD Tapatio for $800,000 USD from Guadalajara of which CD Tapatio was a subsidiary.

On May 21, 2009 it was confirmed that team Club Universidad de Guadalajara entered the Primera División A instead of C.D. Tapatío, which disappeared completely.

Apertura 2013 Champions and promotion to Liga MX
In the Apertura 2013 tournament, Leones Negros finished 5th and entered the Liguilla, where they reached the final and ended as Champions beating Necaxa 2–1, earning the right to compete in the Final de Ascenso and the possibility to be promoted to the 2014–15 Liga MX.

After a hard Clausura 2014 tournament, Leones Negros ended in 4th place, but lost in the quarterfinals against Oaxaca. However, as Apertura 2013 champions, they played the Final de Ascenso against Estudiantes Tecos, who were the Clausura 2014 Champions.

After two very disputed games, both of them ended in a tie, the Promotion was defined in a penalty shoot-out, in which goalkeeper Humberto "Gansito" Hernández scored the final and decisive penalty, giving the Leones Negros the promotion and the right to play in the 2014–15 Liga MX season.

Club Universidad de Guadalajara was officially relegated after only one season in the Mexican top flight on May 9, 2015. Despite winning the match against Cruz Azul 2–0, relegation rivals Puebla managed to obtain a 2–2 tie, thus giving them more percentage in the relegation table. As a result, UdeG returned to Ascenso MX. In the Clausura 2018 tournament the team was close to returning to Liga MX, however, in the final of the championship the team was defeated by Cafetaleros de Tapachula.

In June 2020, UdeG became a member of the Liga de Expansión MX when it replaced Ascenso MX.

Honours

National

Ascenso MX: 1
Apertura 2013
Runner-up (1): Clausura 2018
Campeón de Ascenso: 1
2014

Copa México: 1
1990–91

Primera División: 0
Runner-up (3): 1975–76, 1976–77, 1989–90

Segunda División: 1
1996–97
Runner-up (1): Apertura 2005

Copa de Guadalajara con Pele: 1 
1975

International
CONCACAF Champions' Cup: 1
1978

Personnel

Coaching staff

Players

First-team squad

Out on loan

Reserve teams
Leones Negros UdeG Premier
Reserve team that plays in the Liga Premier, the third level of the Mexican league system.

Leones Negros UdeG (Liga TDP)
Reserve team that plays in the Liga TDP, the fourth level of the Mexican league system.

Managers
 Ignacio Jáuregui (1976–78)
 Gustavo Peña (1978–79)
 Árpád Fekete (1979–81)
 Ignacio Trelles (1986–89)
 Alberto Guerra (1989–92)
 Sergio Díaz (2009)
 Belarmino de Almeida (2009–2010)
 Héctor Medrano (2010–2011)
 Alfonso Sosa (2011–2015), (2021–)
 Daniel Guzmán (2015–2016)
 Joel Sánchez Ramos (2016–2017)
 Jorge Dávalos (2017–2019), (2019–2021)
 Ricardo Rayas (2019)

References

External links

Official site (leonesnegrosudg.mx)
Cambio de Sede a Ciudad Guzmán

 
Football clubs in Jalisco
Association football clubs established in 1970
Uni
Ascenso MX teams
Liga MX teams
1970 establishments in Mexico
CONCACAF Champions League winning clubs